The 2000 Canisius Golden Griffins football team represented Canisius College in the 2000 NCAA Division I-AA football season. The Golden Griffins offense scored 100 points while the defense allowed 373 points.

Schedule

References

Canisius
Canisius Golden Griffins football seasons
College football winless seasons
Canisius Golden Griffins football